Brachycoeliidae is a family of trematodes belonging to the order Plagiorchiida.

Genera:
 Brachycoelium Dujardin, 1845
 Brachycoelium Stiles & Hassall, 1898
 Cymatocarpus Looss, 1899
 Parabrachycoelium Pérez-Ponce de Leon, Mendoza-Garfias, Razo-Mendivil & Parra-Olea, 2011
 Tremiorchis Mehra & Negi, 1926

References

Plagiorchiida